The 1999 Memorial Cup took place from May 15–23 at the Ottawa Civic Centre in Ottawa, Ontario, Canada.  It was the 81st annual Memorial Cup competition and determined the major junior ice hockey champion of the Canadian Hockey League (CHL).  Participating teams were the host Ottawa 67's, the Belleville Bulls, winners of the Ontario Hockey League, the Acadie-Bathurst Titan, winners of the Quebec Major Junior Hockey League and the Calgary Hitmen, Western Hockey League champions.  The host 67's won their second Memorial Cup, the first being in 1984. The 67's, who had lost in the second round of the OHL playoffs to the Bulls were able to win the Cup defeated those same Bulls in a Cup semi-final. The 67's then defeated the Hitmen in the final, an overtime thriller where Matt Zultek scored the winning goal.

The 1999 Memorial Cup set a record for attendance (since the round-robin format was first used in 1972) with a total of 84,200 people in eight sell-out games. It was the first Memorial Cup to be shown on CTV Sportsnet, having moved from TSN. The championship game was shown on the CTV network, where it had last been shown in 1989.

Background
At the beginning of the 1998–1999 season, Ottawa's new owner, Jeff Hunt vowed to bring home the Memorial Cup that season. The awarding of the Cup tournament to Ottawa was a big factor in the team more than doubling the attendance from the previous season. That was definitely taken into consideration when Ottawa was chosen as the host of the 1999 Cup, as every game would be sold out in the 10,525 seat Ottawa Civic Centre. Ottawa had previously bid for the 1996 Memorial Cup but lost the bid to the Peterborough Petes.

CHL All-time team
During the 1999 Memorial Cup, the CHL unveiled its "All-time team" at the Civic Centre, with notably two 67's on the team. Special banners were raised in their honour, and except for Parent and Lemieux, the team attended the event. The team was as follows;

Goal: Bernie Parent, Niagara Falls Flyers (1963–1965)
Defence: Bobby Orr, Oshawa Generals (1963–1966)
Defence: Denis Potvin, Ottawa 67's (1967–1973)
Centre: Mario Lemieux, Laval Voisins (1981–1984)
Right wing: Guy Lafleur, Quebec Remparts (1969–1971)
Left wing: Brian Propp, Brandon Wheat Kings (1976–1979)
Coach: Brian Kilrea, Ottawa 67's (1974–1984; 1986–1994; 1995–2009)

Source:

Rosters

Round-robin standings

Scores 

Semi-final

Final

Scoring leaders 

Justin Davis, OTT (3g, 6a, 9pts)
Mark Bell, OTT (2g, 6a, 8pts)
Pavel Brendl, CAL (4g, 3a, 7pts)
Joe Talbot, OTT (3g, 4a, 7pts)
Nick Boynton, OTT (1g, 6a, 7pts)
Brad Moran, CAL (3g, 3a, 6pts)
Matt Kinch, CAL (0g, 6a, 6pts)
Matt Zultek, OTT (3g, 2a, 5pts)
Glenn Crawford, BEL (3g, 1a, 4pts)
Ian Jacobs, OTT (3g, 1a, 4pts)

Goaltending leaders 

Seamus Kotyk, OTT (2.83 gaa, 0.907 sv%)
Cory Campbell, BEL (2.97 gaa, 0.911 sv%)
Alexandre Fomitchev, CAL (3.49, 0.894 sv%)
Roberto Luongo, ACA (3.67, 0.893 sv%)

Award winners 

Stafford Smythe Memorial Trophy (MVP): Nick Boynton, Ottawa
George Parsons Trophy (Sportsmanship): Brian Campbell, Ottawa
Hap Emms Memorial Trophy (Goaltender): Cory Campbell, Belleville
Ed Chynoweth Trophy (Top Scorer): Justin Davis, Ottawa

All-star team
Goal: Cory Campbell, Belleville
Defence: Matt Kinch, Calgary; Nick Boynton, Ottawa
Forward: Glenn Crawford, Belleville; Joe Talbot, Ottawa; Pavel Brendl, Calgary

References

External links
 Memorial Cup 
 Canadian Hockey League

1998–99 in Canadian ice hockey
Ice hockey competitions in Ottawa
Memorial Cup tournaments